Knema uliginosa is a species of plant in the family Myristicaceae. It is endemic to Borneo.

References

uliginosa
Endemic flora of Borneo
Vulnerable plants
Taxonomy articles created by Polbot
Taxa named by James Sinclair (botanist)